Antigonos of Callas was an ancient Macedonian hetairos from Amphipolis, known through an inscription with a Homeric-style epigram of about 300-275 BC, where he commemorates his win  in Hoplitodromos (a race in full armour) at Heraclean games after the Conquest of Tyre in 332 BC. Alexander had dreamt that Heracles invited him into Tyre. Aristander the seer interpreted this to mean that the city will be captured, but with Herculean effort. Afterwards, Alexander  offered sacrifice to Heracles, and celebrated both a gymnastic and musical contest there (Arrian 3,6,1).

References
Die politische Rolle der Heraklesgestalt im griechischen Herrschertum page 99 by Ulrich Huttner  .
Amphipolis - SEG 48.716

4th-century BC births
3rd-century BC deaths
Ancient Greek generals
Ancient Macedonian athletes
Ancient Macedonian generals
Generals of Alexander the Great
Ancient Amphipolitans
Hetairoi
4th-century BC Macedonians
Greek inscriptions